Tyagayya is a 1981 Indian Telugu-language film directed by Bapu. The cast included J.V. Somayajulu and K. R. Vijaya. The film is based on the life of Saint, Singer, and composer Tyagaraja. Tyagayya was showcased at the Indian Panorama of International Film Festival of India in 1982.

Plot
Thyagaraja composed thousands of devotional compositions, most in Telugu and in praise of Lord Rama, many of which remain popular today, the most popular being "Nagumomu". Of special mention are five of his compositions called the Pancharatna Kritis ( "five gems"), which are often sung in programs in his honour, and Utsava Sampradaya Krithis ( Festive ritual compositions), which are often sung to accompany temple rituals.

Cast
 J. V. Somayajulu as Tyagaraja
 K. R. Vijaya as Kamalamba
 Rao Gopal Rao as Japesam
 Ravi as Lord Rama
 Sangeetha as Goddess Seetha
 Arja Janardhana Raoas Hanuman
 Hemasundar as Lord Shiva
 Jhansi as Tyagayya's sister-in-law
 Sridhar
 Rallapalli
 Sakshi Ranga Rao

References

External links
 

1980s Telugu-language films
1981 films
Films directed by Bapu
Indian biographical films
Films scored by K. V. Mahadevan
Films about classical music and musicians
1980s biographical films

te:త్యాగయ్య (1981 సినిమా)